Thomas Tighe is the president and chief executive officer of Direct Relief, a non-profit organization that provides emergency medical assistance and disaster relief in the United States and internationally. Before joining Direct Relief in October 2000, Tighe spent five years as chief of staff and chief operating officer of the Peace Corps. A native of Palo Alto, California, Tighe has a bachelor's degree from the University of California, Berkeley and a J.D. from the University of California, Hastings College of Law.

References

People from Palo Alto, California
Living people
Year of birth missing (living people)
American nonprofit chief executives
University of California, Berkeley alumni
American chief operating officers
University of California, Hastings College of the Law alumni
Peace Corps volunteers
Henry Crown Fellows